Do Not Marry, Girls  is a 1985  Soviet musical film  directed by Yevgeni Gerasimov.

Plot 
Collective farm chairman Ivan Savelich Malkov (Vyacheslav Nevinny) is faced with an acute shortage of men in his farms, the problem has caused the female workers to complain and attempt to flee the city. Ivan Savelich decides to create an amateur folk ensemble, and show his performance on television, and the result was not long in coming.

Cast
 Vyacheslav Nevinny as Ivan Savelievich Malkov, the chairman of the collective farm 
 Tatyana Dogileva as Valya, an agronomist
 Valery Leontiev (cameo) 
 Natalya Vavilova as  milkmaid
 Victor Pavlov as Victor Skorobeynikov
 Yury Nazarov as Chairman of the Commission
 Lyubov Sokolova as Praskovya Ilinichna
 Stefaniya Staniyuta
 Raisa Ryazanova as Anna Ilinichna
 Nikolai Parfyonov as Trofimov 
 Yevgeny Steblov as Andrey, barber
 Tatyana Agafonova  as Natalia Soldatova, a milkmaid
 Svetlana Ryabova as Olya Dyomina
 Marina Ustimenko as  milkmaid
 Nina Ruslanova as  Anisa Ilinichna

External links

1985 films
1985 comedy films
Soviet comedy films
Gorky Film Studio films